Omniglot is an online encyclopedia focused on languages and writing systems.

Etymology
The name "Omniglot" comes from the Latin prefix omnis (meaning "all") and the Greek root γλωσσα (glossa, meaning "tongue").

History
The website was launched by British author Simon Ager in 1998, originally intended to be a web design and translation service. As Ager collected and added more information about languages and various writing systems, the project evolved into an encyclopedia.

It provides reference materials for 341 written scripts used in different languages, over 880 constructed, adapted and fictional scripts, and materials for learning languages.

It also has reference materials in numerous languages.

Its material was the source for a compendium of characters used for development of artificial intelligence, the Omniglot Challenge. The Omniglot compendium has been used widely since it was first released.

As of December 2021, the number of languages detailed on the site is over 1,600.

See also
 List of online encyclopedias
 Ethnologue

References

Internet properties established in 1998
British online encyclopedias
Linguistics websites